Bella is a feminine given name and a surname.

Bella may also refer to:

Music 
Bands
 Bella (Australian band), a country music trio
 Bella (Canadian band), a Canadian indie pop band
Albums
 Bella (album), released 2011 by Teddy Thompson
 Bella (EP), a 2005 EP by Fivespeed
 Bella EP, a 2013 EP by Maître Gims
Songs
"Bella" (Maître Gims song), from the 2013 album Subliminal
 "Bella", Spanish version of the Ricky Martin 1999 song "She's All I Ever Had"

Places 
 Bella River, Romania
 Bella, Basilicata, a city and commune in Italy
 Isola Bella (Lago Maggiore), an Italian island
 Isola Bella (Sicily), an island off the east coast of Sicily, Italy
 695 Bella, an asteroid

Other uses 
 BELLA (American magazine), a US lifestyle magazine
 Bella (brand), a brand of feminine hygiene products
 Bella (British magazine), a UK weekly women's magazine
 Bella (2006 film), a US drama film
 Bella (2017 film), a Ugandan drama film
 BELLA (laser), the Berkeley Lab Laser Accelerator
 Bella Books, a publisher of lesbian literature
 Bella Center, a congress and exhibition center in Copenhagen, Denmark
 Ikelan, a Tuareg caste, called Bella in the Songhay language
 Zündapp Bella, a motor scooter manufactured by Zündapp from 1953 to 1964

See also

 Bellas (disambiguation)
 Belle (disambiguation)
 Bel (disambiguation)